Shine is the eighth studio album by American singer Cyndi Lauper, released exclusively in Japan in 2004. The album was ready for release in 2001 but Edel Records, the label it was recorded with, folded. The leaked tracks from a demonstration disc quickly circulated on the Internet and by 2002 Lauper realized there was no point in trying to release it in a widespread fashion. Two EPs were released instead: One was also called "Shine" and the other was called "Shine Remixes". The "Shine EP" has sold 41,000 copies in the United States, according to Nielsen SoundScan.

The album expands on the sound Lauper developed with her 1997 album Sisters of Avalon. Mostly pop songs, it flirts with electronica and new wave while incorporating traditional instruments like sitars and fiddles. The songs are not lyrically linked, and explore themes ranging from the Madonna–Whore Complex to celebrity life.

The track "It's Hard to be Me" was penned about Anna Nicole Smith; Smith attempted to buy it as the theme song to her reality show but Lauper declined. In 2010, Lauper did allow the independently produced television pilot Hard to Be Me to use the track for its theme song. She then subsequently used it as the theme song to her own reality show Cyndi Lauper: Still So Unusual.

Track listing
Demonstration Cassette (2001) (Contains Demo Versions)
"Higher Plane"
"Water's Edge"
"Rather Be with You"
"Wide Open"
"Comfort You"
"This Kind of Love"
"Higher Plane" (Eddie X Mix)

EP version (2002)
"Shine" (Edit) - 3:44
"It's Hard to Be Me" - 3:52
"Madonna Whore" - 3:38
"Water's Edge" - 5:22
"Shine" (Illicit Mix) - 4:33

Chart performance

Release history

References

Cyndi Lauper albums
2003 albums
Epic Records albums